Siempre 23 is the debut album of the 'A La Recherche De La Nouvelle Star' winner - Jonatan Cerrada.
The album is sung in French but some songs show of his Spanish roots. His debut album contains his hit singles "Je voulais te dire que je t'attends", "Rien ne me changera", and "À chaque pas".
The album features Lena Ka who duets with him on "Par amour".

Since then Jonatan has released another album La Preuve du contraire.

Track listing

First release

Second release

+ Bonus :
 Documentaries (Interview, Backstage, ...)
 "Je voulais te dire que je t'attends" (music video)
 "Rien ne me changera" (music video)
 "À chaque pas" (music video)

Charts

References

External links
Jonatan Cerrada Official Site
Jonatan Cerrada Fan Site

2003 debut albums
Jonatan Cerrada albums